This is a comprehensive list of past and present local executives who, at least once, served the people of Odiongan, and San Andres and Ferrol when the latter two were still part of Odiongan.

 Died in office. 
 Served in acting capacity. 
 Resigned.

Family Tree

See also
Odiongan, Romblon
Province of Romblon
Politics of the Philippines

References

Odiongan
Politics of Romblon